Thomas Feichtner (born 1970) is a Brazilian-born Austrian industrial designer.

Life
Thomas Feichtner was born to Austrian parents in Vitória, Brazil, in 1970. After attending school in Linz, Austria, and Düsseldorf, Germany, he studied and completed a degree in industrial design at the University of Art and Industrial Design Linz, from 1990 to 1995, where he later taught from 2002 to 2005. In 1997 Feichtner founded his own design studio and initially designed sports equipment and industrial goods. Starting in 2005, he increasingly began to design products for Austrian fabricators and traditional crafters, along with experimental individual pieces for exhibitions. Between 2001 and 2009, he was a partner in a visual communications agency in Linz and Vienna. His son Ferdinand was born in 2008. Feichter has been a professor of product design at the Muthesius Academy of Art in Kiel, Germany, from 2009 to 2014. With his wife Simone Feichtner, he lives and works in Vienna, Austria.

Works
Even as a student, Thomas Feichtner designed numerous products for the Austrian sporting industry, like skateboards and snowboards for Heavy Tools or ski bindings for Tyrolia and Fischer. He later designed skis for Head and Blizzard. In the area of visual communications, Feichtner worked for companies like Swarovski, Adidas Eyewear, European Capital of Culture or the British-Israeli designer Ron Arad. After his early successes as an industrial designer, Feichtner turned to experimental product design in 2005, working with traditional fabricators such as J. & L. Lobmeyr, Porzellanmanufaktur Augarten, Neue Wiener Werkstätten, Wiener Silbermanufactur and Stamm. He has also completed freelance projects in cooperation with Vitra und FSB. His works have found their way into major design collections, like that of MAK – Austrian Museum for Applied Arts/Contemporary Arts.

Awards
 reddot design award 2010, Design Zentrum Nordrhein-Westfalen, Essen, Germany.
 European Design Award 2009, IDA International Council of Graphic Design Associations, Athens, Greece.
 CCA Venus Award 2009, Venus in Bronze, Creativ Club Austria, Vienna.
 Josef Binder Award in Silber 2008, Design Austria, Graphic and Product Design Association, Vienna, Austria.
 Design Award of the Federal Republic of Germany 2007, German Design Council, Frankfurt, Germany.
 Global Awards 2006 Finalist, International Awards Competition, New York Festivals, New York, USA.
 Josef Binder Award 2006, design Austria, Graphic and Product Design Association, Vienna, Austria.
 Design Award of the Federal Republic of Germany 2005, German Design Council, Frankfurt, Germany.
 Josef Binder Award 2004, design Austria, Graphic and Product Design Association, Vienna, Austria.
 BIO19, Biennal of Industrial Design Ljubljana, 2004, Architecture Museum of Ljubljana. Slovenia.
 Gustav Klimt Prize 2004, Vienna, Austria.
 reddot design award 2004, Design Zentrum Nordrhein-Westfalen, Essen, Germany.
 International Advertising Festival Cannes 2003, Shortlist Cannes, Print and Outdoor, Cannes, France.
 IF Design Award 2002, International Forum Design Hannover, Germany.
 Designpreis Schweiz 2001, Design Center AG, Langenthal, Switzerland.
 IF Design Award 2001, International Forum Design Hannover, Germany.
 CCA Venus Award 2000, Venus in Bronze, Creativ Club Austria, Vienna, Austria.

Further reading
 Thomas Feichtner, Design Unplugged, Sketches / Skizzen. By MAK – Austrian Museum of Applied Arts / Contemporary Art and Bildrecht GmbH, Christoph Thun-Hohenstein, Günter Schönberger, Michael Hausenblas. 2016, Birkhäuser Verlag, Basel, 
 Thomas Feichtner, Edge to Edge. By Peter Noever Shonquis Moreno, Lilli Hollein, Bernhard E. Bürdek, Michael Hausenblas. 2010, MAK – Österreichisches Museum für angewandte Kunst / Gegenwartskunst, Birkhäuser Verlag, Basel-Boston-Berlin. .
 Der Fall Forum Design. By Martin Hochleitner, Gabriele Hofer. Norbert Artner, Bernhard E. Bürdek, Kristina Schönhuber, Thomas Feichtner, 2010. Oberösterreichische Landesgalerie Linz, Publication N 1 – Bibliothek der Provinz, Weitra. .
 Once Upon a Chair, Design Beyond the Icon. By Robert Klanten, Sven Ehmann, Andrej Kupetz, Shonquis Moreno. 2009, Die Gestalten Verlag, Berlin, New York. .
 Glanz und Verderben. By Vitus Weh, Tulga Beyerle, Brigitte Felderer, Angelika Höckner, Gerald Moser, Susanne Jäger, Christian Lerch, Ingrid Loschek, Wolfgang Pauser, Thomas Trummer, Vitus Weh, und andere. 2009 Verlag Folio Wien/Bozen. .
 Desire The Shape of Things to Come. By R. Klanten, S. Ehmann, A. Kupetz, S. Moreno, A. Mollard. 2008, Die Gestalten Verlag, Berlin, New York, .
 The Independent Design Guide, Innovative Products from the New Generation. By Laura Houseley, 2009. Thames & Hudson Ltd, London, UK. .
 Examples of Austrian Design. By Thomas Redl, Andreas Thaler, 2000 Löcker Verlag, Vienna. .

References

External links
 
 design austria
 Academy of Fine Arts and Design Kiel

1970 births
Living people
Austrian industrial designers
Austrian furniture designers
Brazilian people of Austrian descent
People from Vitória, Espírito Santo
Businesspeople from Vienna